Slavošovce is a small village and municipality in the Rožňava District in the Košice Region of middle-eastern Slovakia.

History

In historical records the village was first mentioned in 1318.

While the Ottomans occupied most of central Europe, the region north of lake Balaton remained in the Kingdom of Hungary (1538–1867). The town, named NAGY-SZLÁBOS before 1902, was part of the Austrian monarchy, province of Hungary; in Transleithania after the compromise of 1867 in the Kingdom of Hungary.

Geography
The village lies at an altitude of 425 metres and covers an area of 15.533 km2.
It has a population of about 1835 people.

Culture
The village has a public library, a gymnasium and a football pitch.

References

External links
 Slavošovce
 Slavošovce
 http://www.statistics.sk/mosmis/eng/run.html

Villages and municipalities in Rožňava District